Psaphida electilis, the chosen sallow, is a moth of the family Noctuidae. The species was first described by Herbert Knowles Morrison in 1875. It is found in North America from Quebec and Ontario to Florida, west to Texas and Wisconsin.

The wingspan is about 35 mm. Adults are on wing from April to May. There is one generation per year.

The larvae feed on Carya and Juglans species.

External links
Images
Bug Guide
BugFinder Page

Psaphida
Moths of North America
Moths described in 1875